Derol railway station is a small railway station in Panchmahal district, Gujarat. Its code is DRL. It serves Derol village. The station consists of 3 platforms.

Major trains

Following trains halt at Derol railway station in both directions:

 12929/30 Valsad–Dahod Intercity Superfast Express
 11463/64 Somnath–Jabalpur Express (via Itarsi)
 11465/66 Somnath–Jabalpur Express (via Bina)
 19309/10 Shanti Express
 19037/38 Bandra Terminus–Gorakhpur Avadh Express
 19039/40 Bandra Terminus–Muzaffarpur Avadh Express
 19019/20 Bandra Terminus–Dehradun Express
 19023/24 Firozpur Janata Express

References 

Railway stations in Panchmahal district
Vadodara railway division